Mata o le Afi ("Eye of the Fire" or "Source of the Fire") is an active volcano on the island of Savai'i in Samoa. It last erupted in 1902.

1902 eruption
An eruption began on 30 October 1902. It was preceded by a series of thirteen earthquakes, which damaged stone churches at Safune and Sasina and destroyed the church at Paia. The inhabitants of these villages and of Aopo fled. On 8 November Dr Otto Tetens examined the volcano, finding a crater a hundred yards across emitting smoke and rocks, with a second crater two miles to the north where the eruption had finished. The eruption had already begun to die down, and ceased around 17 November.

References

Mountains of Samoa
Volcanoes of Samoa
Savai'i